Andrew Sinclair Sutherland  (13 September 1882 – 2 May 1961) was a New Zealand politician of the National Party.

Biography

Sutherland was born in 1882 in Palmerston, Otago. He was a member of the 9th New Zealand contingent (1902) to the Boer War.

He was senior whip from 1950 to 1954.

In the 1955 Queen's Birthday Honours, Sutherland was appointed a Commander of the Order of the British Empire, for public services.

Notes

References

1882 births
1961 deaths
New Zealand National Party MPs
New Zealand military personnel of the Second Boer War
Unsuccessful candidates in the 1938 New Zealand general election
Members of the New Zealand House of Representatives
New Zealand MPs for North Island electorates
New Zealand Commanders of the Order of the British Empire
Auckland Harbour Board members
People from Palmerston, New Zealand